Tribal Gathering is the original British electronic dance music festival that between 1993 and 2004 catered for different types of dance music cultures such as techno, house and drum & bass. After 18 years, Tribal Gathering returns in 2023 for a two-day event to celebrate its 30th anniversary.

History
The original promoters of Universe (Paul Shurey, Rob Vega, Jamie smith and former Bath Rugby Captain Roger Spurrell, Tennant and Jill Trick) had been organising events since the heady days of 1989 when raves such as Sunrise, Raindance and Perception were in their pomp. They wanted to organise an event to bring together the different sub-cultures of the dance world and also to have a festival feel to it.

The first Tribal Gathering took place Friday 30 April 1993 at Lower Pertwood Farm near Warminster, Wiltshire. 25,000 attended to see acts such as Laurent Garnier, Carl Cox, Aphex Twin, DiY Sound System and Pete Tong.

In March 1994 they opened the legendary London night club 'Final Frontier', at Club UK in Wandsworth. Weekly nights ran for several years, relocating in 1997 to the Complex Club in Islington. Each week featured numerous headline djs and live acts, the likes of which had never been seen before. A proud moment for the promoters was when 'Final Frontier' was voted number 5 in Musik Magazines top 50 clubs of all time, just behind Studio 54, Dorian Gray, Paradise Garage and Limelight.

Also in 1993 the Universe - World Techno Tribe compilation CD was released in Europe on Rising High Records, on Sony Music in Japan and Moonshine Music in the USA. Compiled and mixed by Mr Oz it reached number 4 in the Gallup album charts. Subsequent CDs were later released on MMS records and FFRR.

The Criminal Justice Bill of 1994 discouraged massive outdoor raves. In 1994 Tribal Gathering moved to Munich, Germany and in cooperation with "N.A.S.A/ Hannover Nice And Safe Attitude" staged an event there.

In the UK, Tribal Gathering teamed up with the Mean Fiddler organisation to organise more legal festivals. The next event took place in May 1995, at Otmoor Park, Beckley, Oxfordshire. Headline acts included The Prodigy, Orbital and Moby.

The 1996 version of the Tribal Gathering took place in June at Luton Hoo, Bedfordshire with 30,000 turning up to see sets by Underworld, Leftfield, The Chemical Brothers, Black Grape, Goldie, Daft Punk and others.

In 1997, at Luton Hoo, Kraftwerk were the headliners of the festival, playing for the first time in the UK since 1992. The show was a monumental success, even though there was no new material released since The Mix.

From 1994 Universe ran the infamous London club night Final Frontier at Club UK, three rooms of electronic music in varying form and style. Acid, Techno, Tribal, Trance and House. Their DJ lineups were nothing short of phenomenal, each Friday over four years resident DJ's Gayle San, Tin Tin, Mr Oz, Murf and Matt Tangent played along side nearly every 'A' list DJ from the UK, EU and around The Globe! After 4 years at Club UK the Universe Crew moved from Wandsworth and moved to Islington and rebranded from Final Frontier to Voyager, which was held at Complex Club, which was previously the home of the AWOL Drum and Bass events. 
 
By 1998, the Tribal Gathering name had grown into a brand. There were albums, a TV show and plans to establish events worldwide in the pipeline. However their things did not go to schedule and the 1998 event did not take place due to Universe and Mean Fiddler's legal battle over the Tribal Gathering name.

In 1999 David Vincent bought the Tribal Gathering name from Paul Shurey and Ian Jenkinson, with the aim of bringing the event back to life.

The Tribal Gathering name was revived in 2000 at the legendary Sankeys Soap club, Manchester. The weekly legendary "Tribal Sessions" club night took place at Sankeys with DJs generally playing House, Techno, Tech-house, Acid House & Breaks & Beats. Tribal Sessions djs included Richie Hawtin, Jeff Mills, Carl Cox, Sasha, Steve Lawler, Laurent Garnier and many others. Tribal Sessions won many awards from Mixmag best club of the year 2004. There was also 2 exhibitions in Manchester Museum of Science and Industry for the brand for providing significant culture for the city of Manchester.

In 2002 Tribal Gathering returned as a weekender at Southport Pontins to a sell-out 5,000 capacity crowd with DJs Sasha, Dave Clarke, Deep Dish, Derrick Carter, Erol Alkan amongst others performing with many rave reviews. There was a follow up event in November 2003.

In 2003 Tribal Gathering held the first legal warehouse party for over 10 years in a "secret" Manchester location, which turned out to be a warehouse previously used as a set for the movie 24 Hour Party People, which was decorated to replicate The Haçienda nightclub. 12,000 people attended where artistes like Groove Armada, Laurent Garnier, Jeff Mills, Deep Dish appeared. The event won best event of the year 2003 with Mixmag and was voted second best party ever by Mixmag in 2004.

In 2004 Tribal Gathering held a two-day warehouse party in a Manchester City Centre in association with the Hacienda with DJs Groove Armada, Graeme Park and Mike Pickering.

In July 2005, a Tribal Gathering festival was organised, in aid of the war victims in Darfur, Sudan, to take place again at Luton Hoo but it was cancelled due to the terrorist attacks that took place on 7 July in London. There has not been an event since but inside music industry sources are reporting that the Festival will return on April Bank Holiday Weekend 2023 to celebrate its 30th Anniversary.

See also
List of electronic music festivals

References

External links
 Flyer for the 1996 Tribal Gathering event
 Obituary to Paul Shurey

Music festivals established in 1993
Music festivals in England
Rave culture in the United Kingdom
1993 establishments in England
Recurring events disestablished in 2006
Electronic music festivals in the United Kingdom
Rave
Trance festivals